Nabla may refer to any of the following:

 the nabla symbol ∇
 the vector differential operator, also called del, denoted by the nabla
 Nabla, tradename of a type of rail fastening system (of roughly triangular shape)
 Nabla (moth), a genus of moths
 Nabla (instrument), the Greek word for a Phoenician or Hebrew stringed instrument after the triangular shape of which all of the above are named